Gottlieb Gerhard Titius (5 June 166110 April 1714) was a German jurist.

Gottlieb Gerhard Titius was born on 5 June 1661 in Nordhausen, Thuringia, and died on 10 April 1714 in Leipzig.

Titius taught Roman law at Leipzig University, where he was on the faculty from 1688. He edited De jure naturae et gentium, a treatise by Samuel von Pufendorf, and wrote a commentary on De officio by Pufendorf.

Christian Thomasius was his teacher.

Titius's work influenced Jean Barbeyrac.

Works 
 Specimen juris publici Romano-Germanici (1698)
 Observationes in Pufendorfii libros de officiis hominis et civis (1703)
 Jus privatum Romano German (1709)

Citations

Works cited 
 

1661 births
1714 deaths
17th-century German writers
German jurists
Academic staff of Leipzig University
People from Nordhausen, Thuringia